Bharati Defence and Infrastructure Limited (formerly Bharati Shipyard Limited) is one of the largest shipbuilding companies in India.

History
Bharati Shipyard Limited (BSL) was founded in 1973 in Ratnagiri, Maharashtra by Prakash C. Kapoor and Vijay Kumar, graduates of the Ocean Engineering & Naval Architecture program at Indian Institute of Technology, Kharagpur, as well as colleagues at Mazagon Dock Limited. The company went public in December 2004, with listings on the Bombay Stock Exchange and the National Stock Exchange.

In 2005, BSL subsequently acquired a 51% stake in privately held Pinky Shipyard Private Limited based in Goa. In 2009, BSL won majority control of Great Offshore Limited in a bidding war with ABG Shipyard Limited. In November 2010, BSL acquired a majority stake in South India based Tebma Shipyards for INR 757.5 Million.

BSL bought the entire equipment and infrastructure of the iconic British shipyard, Swan Hunter, in 2007, after it declared bankruptcy.

In 2015, the shipyard group found itself heavily indebted and in severe financial difficulties.  In developing a restructuring plan, the Edelweiss Asset Reconstruction Company acquired 70 per cent of the debt from the lending banks and, as an indication of a desire to concentrate on defence business, the company's name was changed in 2015 to Bharati Defence and Infrastructure Limited. In January 2019 the National Company Law Tribunal declared the restructuring proposals from Edelweiss to be unacceptable and ordered the company's liquidation.

Facilities
Bharati Shipyard is headquartered in Mumbai. It operates shipbuilding facilities in Ratnagiri, Dabhol, Mangalore and Kolkata. It has structural quality assurance facilities at Ghodbunder Road in Thane district. Its subsidiary, Pinky Shipyard, has shipbuilding facilities in Goa. Its subsidiary, Tebma Shipyard, has shipbuilding facilities in Karnataka, Kerala and Tamil Nadu.

BSL's Dabhol yard is one of the largest in India, spread over 300 acres. In 2007, BSL bought the entire equipment and infrastructure, of bankrupt British shipyard Swan Hunter. The infrastructure, including the iconic cranes and the floating dock, was dismantled, transported to India, and installed at BSL's Dabhol yard.

Products
Bharati Shipyard builds jackup rigs, platform supply vessels, tractor and ASD tugs, dredgers, deep sea fishing vessels, bulk carriers, cargo and container ships, tankers and roll-on/roll-off vessels.

In March 2009, it was awarded a  contract to build 15 high-speed interceptors for the Indian Coast Guard.

References

Shipbuilding companies of India
Manufacturing companies based in Mumbai
1973 establishments in Maharashtra
Indian companies established in 1973
Manufacturing companies established in 1973
Companies listed on the National Stock Exchange of India
Companies listed on the Bombay Stock Exchange